ABC Radio Brisbane (callsign: 4QR) is an ABC Local Radio station in Brisbane, Queensland. It is one of the largest stations in the network, serving as a base for Queensland programming - many programs are broadcast across the ABC Local Radio network in regional and rural areas of Queensland when those stations are not carrying local programming.

General history

Radio broadcasting began in Brisbane in 1925 when the Government of Queensland commenced its own broadcasting operations with the callsign 4QG - 4 denoted the state of Queensland; QG stood for Queensland Government. 4QG became a part of the ABC's radio network at its inception in 1932.

The ABC started a second Brisbane station on 7 January 1938, using the callsign 4QR. The new station carried national programming—the forerunner of Radio National—while 4QG aired mainly local content. On 28 July 1963, the two stations quietly switched schedules, with 4QR becoming the local outlet for Brisbane while 4QG picked up the national schedule. ABC officials wanted to minimise interruptions of regular programming by parliamentary sessions. 4QG now operates under the callsign 4RN, in common with all other Radio National services in Queensland.

Until December 2006, ABC Radio Brisbane's studios were located on Coronation Drive in the Brisbane inner-city suburb of Toowong.

A number of breast cancer cases at the ABC's Toowong studios led to the permanent evacuation of the entire site in December 2006 with 350 staff, from ABC television, radio and online relocated. For the next five years, the station broadcast from an office building in Lissner Street, Toowong. In January 2012, ABC Radio Brisbane moved to a newly built facility in South Bank. The old site is set to eventually become a three tower residential complex.

In September 2006, ABC Radio Brisbane was "host radio broadcaster" for naturalist Steve Irwin's memorial service at Australia Zoo, Beerwah. Breakfast announcers Spencer Howson (from ABC Radio Brisbane) and John Stokes (from the ABC Sunshine Coast station) were chosen to host the broadcast, made available to radio stations around the world.

The ABC Brisbane Centre, which was designed by Richard Kirk and built by Leighton Contractors, opened in 2012.

Technical history
Radio 4QR commenced operation on 7 January 1938.

At commencement the station was owned by the Commonwealth of Australia and under the legislation of the day required no licence. The Postmaster-General's Department maintained the transmission system and the station's studios, while the Australian Broadcasting Commission (subsequently Australian Broadcasting Corporation from 1 July 1983) created the programme content to be transmitted. A licence was issued for the first time in 1992 in accordance with the newly legislated Broadcasting Services Act.

Initially it operated on a frequency of 940 kHz within the then current 10 kHz channel spacing plan. On 1 September 1948 the station changed frequency to 590 kHz to accord with a revised Australia / New Zealand 10 kHz channel spacing plan which involved many changes to Australian station frequencies, particularly those in Queensland and New South Wales. In 1972/1973 the 4QR frequency was changed slightly to 580 kHz. Finally, on 24 November 1978 the frequency was changed to 612 kHz to accord with the 9 kHz channel spacing plan which had been agreed by Australia at Geneva in 1975 ("The 1975 Geneva Agreement").

Station 4QR has seen several power increases since its commencement, both to increase its coverage area and to ameliorate increasing levels of man-made radio noise and night-time skywave interference levels. Initial operation was at 500 Watts. Power was increased to 1 kW in 1942/1943 and again to 2 kW in 1944/1945 to support the many military personnel in Brisbane during World War II. Power was increased to 10 kW in 1948/1949 and finally to 50 kW in 1962/1963.

At the time of initial establishment Radio 4QR operated from a city location. For many years now Radio 4QR has shared (with Radio 4QG, now 4RN) a tall dual anti-fading guyed and sectionalised vertical radiator of 198 metres AGL with structural capacitative top hat located at Bald Hills on the northern outskirts of Brisbane. The mast is a very prominent feature visible from major highways in the vicinity. There is a shorter (81 metres AGL) vertical guyed radiator on the site which provides a standby capability during main antenna maintenance.

Local Programs
Breakfast is heard on ABC Radio Brisbane each weekday between 5am and 7:45am, and features news, sports, weather forecasts, financial information, discussions about the day's news and live traffic reports. ABC News bulletins are broadcast throughout the program on the half-hour from 5am until 8am. The program has won numerous ratings surveys in the Brisbane radio market throughout recent years.

Spencer Howson presented the program for eleven years, from the beginning of 2006 and to the end of 2016. In November 2016, Howson announced he was stepping down from hosting the breakfast show. In December 2016, it was announced that Queensland Country Hour presenter Craig Zonca would be the new host of the station's breakfast show commencing in 2017. In December 2017, ABC announced that Rebecca Levingston would join Craig Zonca to host Breakfast from January 2018.

In yet another on-air shakeup, Rebecca Levingston claimed the coveted Mornings slot from January 2019, and Zonca was paired with Loretta Ryan, relegating Emma Griffiths to Weekend Mornings.

Mornings is broadcast from 8:30am until 11:00am with the first 30 minutes devoted to the main news stories of the day. Prime ministers, premiers and other politicians will lobby to be interviewed in this first half-hour. After 9:00am talkback callers are encouraged to contribute to the day's debate. Mornings has proved almost as controversial as the stories normally covered on the local current affairs show.  Several people have presented the show over the years with their departure often making headlines.

Recent presenters have been Steve Austin (2011-7), Madonna King (2006–11), Steve Austin (2004-5), Kirsten Macgregor (2003), Susan Mitchell (2002), Andrew Carroll (2000-1), Cathy Border (2000), John Barton, Carolyn Tucker (1998–99), Anna Reynolds and Rod Henshaw. In 2002, the ABC was forced to apologise to Andrew Carroll and admit he was unfairly sacked. Carroll was taken off-air after commenting, during an interview with Queensland Premier Peter Beattie, that he would have to "reconsider the terms of his contract" (or similar).  Carroll's story was featured on the ABC's own media watchdog program Media Watch. In October 2011, King announced that she would be leaving the station to spend more time with her children.

In December 2011, Steve Austin was announced as King's replacement. In December 2017, ABC announced that Breakfast with Craig Zonca and Rebecca Levingston would extend to 10am and a new show Focus Brisbane with Emma Griffiths will replace the Mornings show. In 2019, further changes saw the Brisbane Focus program discontinued - and the Mornings resumed with Rebecca Levingston as host.

Afternoons is broadcast on ABC Radio Brisbane between 12.30pm and 3.30pm and is presented by Katherine Feeney. Between 12.30pm and 1.30pm the program is only heard on ABC Radio Brisbane and ABC Gold Coast. From 1.30pm to 3.00pm the program is statewide on the ABC Local Radio Queensland network. Between 3.00pm and 3.30pm the program is only heard on ABC Radio Brisbane.

Drive is heard between 3.30pm and 6:30pm and is presented by Steve Austin.

Evenings is heard from 7pm until 10pm Monday to Thursday and is simulcast on the regional ABC Local Radio Queensland network. Due to daylight saving time, the show is only broadcast from 7pm until 9pm during summer months. On Fridays, a national edition of Evenings hosted by Christine Anu is heard. Former ABC News television presenter David Curnow was appointed host of Evenings in late 2013. However, in December 2017, ABC announced that Kelly Higgins-Devine would replace David Curnow from January 2018.

Saturday Breakfast is broadcast between 6am and 7:45am each week with Kate O'Toole. The first hour of the program is dedicated to taking talkback calls with Gardening questions.

Weekend Mornings is broadcast between 8:30am and 12pm on Saturdays and from 10am and 12pm on Sundays with Kate O'Toole. The program is simulcast on the ABC Local Radio Queensland's regional network between 10am and midday on both days.

References

External links
ABC Radio Brisbane online
A history of ABC radio in Brisbane

Brisbane
Radio stations in Brisbane
Radio stations established in 1938
1938 establishments in Australia